František Josef Studnička (27 June 1836, Soběslav, Bohemia – 21 February 1903, Prague, Bohemia) was a Czech mathematician and popular pedagogue at Charles University in Prague. He was also an active contributor to astronomy and meteorology. He was known as the author of several textbooks and popular articles.

1836 births
1903 deaths
19th-century Czech people
Austro-Hungarian mathematicians
Czech mathematicians
People from Tábor District
Academic staff of Charles University
Czech meteorologists